Leprechaun: Back 2 tha Hood (also known as Leprechaun 6) is a 2003 American slasher film written and directed by Steven Ayromlooi, and a standalone sequel to Leprechaun in the Hood (2000). It is the sixth installment of the Leprechaun series, and as of 2023, it is the last entry to star Warwick Davis in the title role. The film has a villainous leprechaun rampaging through an urban area and killing anyone in his path while looking for his gold, which was stolen by a group of youths who are using it to fulfill their wildest dreams. It is the first film in the series to be released by Lionsgate.

Plot 
An animated prologue reveals the origins of Leprechauns, summoned by an ancient king to protect his gold. After the king's death, the Leprechauns returned to their places of origin, all except one (Warwick Davis), who became corrupted through the ages and obsessed with the gold he still guarded. In the present, Los Angeles pastor Father Jacob (Willie C. Carpenter) finds the gold and intends to use it to finance the building of a youth center. After a struggle, Jacob banishes the Leprechaun by splashing him with holy water laced with four-leafed clovers, summoning demonic hands to drag him underground, but dies of his injuries.

One year later, friends Emily Woodrow (Tangi Miller) and Lisa Duncan (Sherrie Jackson) have their fortune told by the clairvoyant Esmeralda (Donzaleigh Abernathy), who warns they will soon attain great wealth, but it must be denied as it will come at a great price and summon a terrible evil. At a barbecue at the abandoned youth center site with Lisa, stoner friend Jamie Davis (Page Kennedy) and ex-boyfriend-turned-drug dealer Rory Jackson (Laz Alonso), Emily falls through a hole and discovers the Leprechaun's gold, hidden by Father Jacob. Splitting the treasure, the four friends use the gold to fulfill their fantasies, unaware they have released the Leprechaun. He stalks the group, impaling a guest at Jamie's party with a bong and retrieving one of his coins, prompting the police to arrest Jamie. At the beauty salon where Emily works, the Leprechaun kills a regular customer, Doria, on the massage table and attacks Emily. She escapes, warning Rory and the recently released Jamie, and they rush to find Lisa. In her home, Lisa is killed when the Leprechaun claws her in the stomach, and her friends find her body.

While Emily and Jamie want to return the gold, Rory does not and takes off with it; realizing Rory is gone, Emily is chased outside by the Leprechaun, but is saved when Rory has a change of heart and returns. The Leprechaun finds Rory's house and kills his profligate girlfriend Chanel (Keesha Sharp) by tearing out her jaw, reclaiming the gold she used to make a tooth, while Rory and Emily are harassed by Officers Thompson (Beau Billingslea) and Whitaker (Chris Murray). When the Leprechaun appears and kills the officers, Emily and Rory escape and regroup with Jamie, only to be confronted by Rory's drug-dealing rivals, led by Watson (Shiek Mahmud-Bey) and Cedric (Sticky Fingaz). Planning to kill Rory for infringing on their territory, Watson and his gang are disposed of by the Leprechaun, while Emily, Rory and Jamie drive off in Watson's car, seeking Esmeralda's help.

She advises using four-leaf clovers against the Leprechaun, and Rory laces hollow-point bullets with clovers Jamie finds in the marijuana Rory sold him earlier. When the Leprechaun arrives, Rory shoots him with the clover bullets, only for his gun to jam before he can finish him off. Rory and Emily have the chance to escape with the gold when the Leprechaun is distracted by Jamie, wounded by a baseball bat to the leg, and Esmeralda dies in a magical duel with the Leprechaun. Followed to the roof of the building, Rory tries fighting the Leprechaun and is knocked out. Before the Leprechaun can kill him, Emily throws some of his gold into wet concrete to get his attention and lures him into the basement of the building, where she tosses his gold into a furnace before knocking the Leprechaun inside.

Believing the Leprechaun dead, Emily returns to Rory, only for the Leprechaun to renew his attack. Knocking Emily off the roof and leaving her barely holding on, the Leprechaun taunts her, but is shot several times by Rory. He runs out of bullets, but distracts the Leprechaun long enough for Emily to hit him with the chest of coins, sending him into the wet concrete below, where the Leprechaun sinks and becomes trapped with his gold. Afterwards, Emily and Rory renew their relationship, and along with Jaime move on with their lives.

The film concludes with an animated epilogue as the Leprechaun digs himself out in a cliffhanger.

Cast 
 Warwick Davis as The Leprechaun
 Tangi Miller as Emily Woodrow
 Laz Alonso as Rory Jackson
 Page Kennedy as Jamie Davis
 Sherrie Jackson as Lisa Duncan
 Donzaleigh Abernathy as Esmeralda
 Shiek Mahmud-Bey as Bryn Lee Watson
 Sticky Fingaz as Cedric
 Keesha Sharp as Chanel
 Sonya Eddy as Yolanda
 Beau Billingslea as Officer Thompson
 Chris Murray as Officer Whitaker
 Vickilyn Reynolds as Doria
 Willie C. Carpenter as Father Jacob

Filming 
The film was originally set to take place on a tropical island in the midst of spring break, though executives at Lions Gate had director and writer Steven Ayromlooi change the location to an urban environment, like the previous entry in the series.

Reception 
The film holds an 18% approval rating on review aggregator website Rotten Tomatoes, based on 11 reviews. The film was included in Entertainment Weekly'''s "The worst movie sequels ever" article, writing, "if a movie could spark a race riot, this is it".

 Reboot and sequel 
It would be 11 years before another Leprechaun movie was released, the 2014 film Leprechaun: Origins, the first film in the series not to star Warwick Davis in the titular role; the film is a reboot of the franchise. Another film, Leprechaun Returns, directly following up the first film from 1993, was made for television in 2018, also without Davis.

From as early as 2008 to as late as 2019, writer/director Darren Lynn Bousman has expressed interest in making another Leprechaun'' film, with the idea of placing the titular character in the Old West, with Warwick Davis starring.

References

External links 
 
 

2003 films
2003 direct-to-video films
African-American comedy horror films
American slasher films
2000s English-language films
Direct-to-video horror films
Direct-to-video sequel films
Direct-to-video interquel films
Hood films
Leprechaun (film series)
American supernatural horror films
Lionsgate films
African-American horror films
2000s American films